Hardi (born May 26, 1951, Blitar, (East Jawa) is an Indonesian  artist, a member of the New Art Movement.

Brief biography 
In 1971-1974 he studied at the Academy of Fine Arts of Indonesia in Yogyakarta, in 1975-1977 - at the Academy of Jan van Eyck in Maastricht  (Netherlands). The first solo exhibition (1976) was also held there. One of the founders of the Cultural Forum of Jakarta (Sept. 2015). His first three paintings were sold in 1970 to a small shop owned by a certain Neka, who later turned into one of the largest art dealers in Indonesia.

Creativity 
His first pictures reflected social protest in accordance with the ideas of the New Art Movement  of which he was a member. In 1978, he was arrested for a photo collage depicting the artist in a general form with the title "President of 2001. Suhardi". But soon he was released with the help of the Vice-President Malik, Adam, art lover.

Later he became an adherent of expressionism. There are numerous portrait works made by the artist (for example, the portrait of Raden Saleh or the president Joko Widodo) and paintings on mythological subjects.

He is also a master of making krises.

He held 16 personal exhibitions in different countries. Since 2009, he is an active member of the working committee of the Congress of Culture of Indonesia. The artist's paintings are kept in the museums of Jakarta and Bali, in private collections. June 17–26, 2011 in Jakarta there was held his personal retrospective exhibition "Art and Politics" in connection with the 60th anniversary of the artist.

The artist's works are of acute social character.

Some of his works served as the basis for the cover designs of several books published in Russia.

Awards 
 Award of the Indonesian government "Permata" (2002)

References

Indonesian artists
1951 births
Living people